The 1820 United States presidential election in Alabama took place between November 1 and December 6, 1820, as part of the nationwide presidential election. The state legislature chose three representatives, or electors to the Electoral College, who voted for President and Vice President.

Alabama, along with eight other states, had its electors chosen not by the people, but by the State House and Senate. George W. Philips, Henry Minor and John Scott were selected by the legislature and all three men voted for James Monroe.

Results

See also
United States presidential elections in Alabama

References

Alabama
1820
1820 Alabama elections